Eudaroniidae is a family of gastropods belonging to the order Seguenziida. The family consists of only one genus: Eudaronia Cotton, 1945.

References

Gastropods
Gastropod families